Eremophila pterocarpa subsp. acicularis is a plant in the figwort family, Scrophulariaceae and is endemic to Western Australia.  It is a locally common shrub with grey leaves and sepals and a red flower tube which is orange inside.

Description
The leaves and stems are covered with powder-like short, matted hairs. Unlike those in subspecies pterocarpa, the leaf bases are not twisted

There are 5 sepals which are narrow egg-shaped to triangular and of approximately equal lengths. As with the leaves, the sepals and petals have a dusty covering of short, fine hairs. Flowering occurs between June and July and is followed by fruits which are flattened and dry with papery wings.

Taxonomy and naming
The species was first formally described in 1904 by William Vincent Fitzgerald in the Journal of the Royal Society of Western Australia. When Robert Chinnock reviewed the genus, he recognised the subspecies - E. pterocarpa subsp. acicularis.

Distribution and habitat
Subspecies acicularis occurs between Wiluna and Meekatharra areas where it grows in places that are more rocky or saline than for subspecies pterocarpa.

Conservation
Subspecies acicularis is listed as "not threatened" by the Government of Western Australia Department of Parks and Wildlife.

References

pterocarpa acicularis
Plants described in 2007
Flora of Western Australia
Plant subspecies